Choc (meaning "Shock" in English) was a fortnightly French language magazine based in France.

History and profile
Choc was launched on 17 June 2004. The magazine, published on a fortnightly basis, is part of Hachette Filipacchi Media, a subsidiary of Lagardère Group. It is geared towards publishing shocking photographs. It also covers celebrity photographs.

A US edition of the magazine, Shock, was briefly published by Hachette Filipacchi Media U.S. between May and December 2006.

The company, SCPE, which owns the magazine Choc went into receivership on September 15, 2009 before being liquidated in 2012.

References

2004 establishments in France
Biweekly magazines published in France
French-language magazines
Lagardère Media
Magazines established in 2004
News magazines published in France